Eric Umedalen (born Johansson, 10 February 1904 – 22 February 1972) was a Swedish hammer thrower who won a silver medal at the 1946 European Championships.

References

Swedish male hammer throwers
1904 births
1972 deaths
European Athletics Championships medalists